Phyllophora is a genus of red algae in the family Phyllophoraceae.

Species

, the World Register of Marine Species included the following species in the genus Phyllophora:
Phyllophora abyssalis Skottsberg, 1919
Phyllophora ahnfeltioides Skottsberg, 1919
Phyllophora antarctica A.Gepp & E.S.Gepp, 1905
Phyllophora crispa (Hudson) P.S.Dixon, 1964
Phyllophora fimbriata Ercegovic, 1949
Phyllophora gelidioides P.L.Crouan & H.M.Crouan ex Karsakoff, 1896
Phyllophora herediae (Clemente) J.Agardh, 1842
Phyllophora japonica Yendo, 1920
Phyllophora lactuca (C.Agardh) Greville
Phyllophora lanceolata Filarszky
Phyllophora lucida (Turner) Greville
Phyllophora luxurians (C.Agardh) Montagne
Phyllophora mammillosa (Goodenough & Woodward) Areschoug
Phyllophora nicaeensis (J.V.Lamouroux) F.Schmitz
Phyllophora pacifica (Hollenberg) Kylin
Phyllophora peruviana Dawson, Acleto & Foldvik
Phyllophora pristioides (Turner) Greville
Phyllophora pseudoceranoides (S.G.Gmelin) Newroth & A.R.A.Taylor, 1971
Phyllophora seminervis (C.Agardh) Greville
Phyllophora sicula (Kützing) Guiry & L.M.Irvine, 1976
Phyllophora submaritima E.Y.Dawson, 1949
Phyllophora submaritimus E.Y.Dawson, 1961
Phyllophora turquetii (Hariot) Skottsberg
Phyllophora vittata (Turner) Greville

References

Red algae genera
Phyllophoraceae